Carlos Daniel Tocci Lugo (born August 23, 1995) is a Venezuelan professional baseball outfielder for the Piratas de Campeche of the Mexican League. He has played in Major League Baseball (MLB) for the Texas Rangers.

Career

Philadelphia Phillies
Tocci signed with the Philadelphia Phillies as an international free agent in August 2011. He made his professional debut in 2012 with the Gulf Coast Phillies and spent the whole season there, slashing .278/.330/.299 in 38 games. He spent 2013 with the Lakewood BlueClaws where he batted .209 with 26 RBIs in 118 games and he returned there in 2014, posting a .242 batting average two home runs, 30 RBIs, and a .622 OPS in 125 games. He hit his professional home run in July 2014. In 2015, he played for Lakewood and the Clearwater Threshers, batting .287/.339/.363 with four home runs and 43 RBIs in 127 games between both teams, and in 2016, he returned to the Threshers, compiling a .284 batting average with three home runs and 50 RBIs in 127 games. He spent 2017 with both the Reading Fightin Phils and the Lehigh Valley IronPigs, slashing .294/.346/.381 with three home runs and 52 RBIs in 130 games.

Texas Rangers
After the 2017 season, the Chicago White Sox selected Tocci from the Phillies in the Rule 5 draft, and traded him to the Texas Rangers for cash considerations. Tocci made the Rangers' Opening Day 25-man roster. Tocci spent the 2018 season on the Texas roster, posting a batting line of .225/.271/.283/.554 with zero home runs, 5 RBI, and 120 at bats in 65 games. 

In 2019, Tocci was optioned to the Triple-A Nashville Sounds to open the season. On July 22, 2019, Tocci was designated for assignment. On July 27, Tocci was outrighted to Nashville. On August 3, the Rangers released Tocci.

Washington Nationals
On January 7, 2020, Tocci signed a minor league deal with the Washington Nationals. Tocci did not play in a game in 2020 due to the cancellation of the minor league season because of the COVID-19 pandemic. In 2021, Tocci played in 50 games split between the Double-A Harrisburg Senators and the Triple-A Rochester Red Wings, hitting a cumulative .200/.273/.258 with one home run and 6 RBI. He was released on August 17, 2021.

Piratas de Campeche
On March 10, 2023, Tocci signed with the Piratas de Campeche of the Mexican League.

See also
Rule 5 draft results
List of Major League Baseball players from Venezuela

References

External links

1995 births
Living people
Sportspeople from Maracay
Venezuelan expatriate baseball players in the United States
Major League Baseball players from Venezuela
Major League Baseball outfielders
Texas Rangers players
Florida Complex League Phillies players
Lakewood BlueClaws players
Clearwater Threshers players
Tigres de Aragua players
Reading Fightin Phils players
Lehigh Valley IronPigs players
Frisco RoughRiders players
Round Rock Express players
Nashville Sounds players
Harrisburg Senators players
Rochester Red Wings players